Kellyton is an incorporated town in Coosa County, Alabama, United States. It had a population of 217 as of the 2010 census.

The town is part of the Talladega-Sylacauga Micropolitan Statistical Area.

Demographics

Kellyton was previously listed in the 1920 and 1930 U.S. Censuses as an incorporated community. It did not appear again on the census until 2010.

Notable person
Justin Tuck, NFL player

Gallery

References

Towns in Coosa County, Alabama
Towns in Alabama
Alexander City micropolitan area